Sabine Getty (née Ghanem; born August 14, 1984) is a Swiss-Lebanese jewelry designer, socialite, and contributing editor at Tatler.

Early life
Ghanem was born and raised in Geneva, Switzerland. Her father, Charbel Ghanem, is a Lebanese financier and her mother, Karine Ratl, is an Egyptian interior decorator. Ghanem speaks English, French and Arabic. She studied theatre and opera before switching to design. She graduated from the Gemological Institute of America in 2012 before moving to London.

Career
Her jewelry line "Sabine G.", is based in London and sold at Bergdorf Goodman in New York, Maxfield in Los Angeles, Browns in London, Montaigne Market in Paris, and in stores in Monaco, Vienna, and Beirut.

Getty also works as a contributing editor for Tatler.

Personal life
Ghanem married hedge fund manager Joseph Getty, son of Mark Getty and Domitilla Harding and a grandson of Sir John Paul Getty, in 2015 in a Catholic ceremony at the Basilica of the Twelve Apostles in Rome, Italy. Her dress was a custom made haute couture gown by Schiaparelli with a hooded cloak designed by Lesage and Charlotte Olympia heels.

Wedding guests included Princess Elisabeth von Thurn und Taxis, Princess Beatrice of York, Ginevra Elkann, Lady Getty, Charlotte Olympia Dellal, Pierre Casiraghi, Julia Restoin Roitfeld, and Bianca Brandolini d’Adda. A party celebrating the wedding celebrations was hosted at the Palazzo Taverna. The wedding reception was held at the Castle Odescalchi.

In 2019 Getty and her husband were featured in Tatler's 'Social Power List' alongside Prince William, Duke of Cambridge and Catherine, Duchess of Cambridge as having significant social influence in the United Kingdom.

In 2017 Getty gave birth to a daughter, Gene Honor Getty. In 2019 she gave birth to a son, Jupiter Mark Getty.

References

British jewellery designers
English expatriates in Switzerland
English people of Egyptian descent
English people of Lebanese descent
English magazine editors
British socialites
British Roman Catholics
Sabine
English Roman Catholics
Lebanese designers
Living people
Artists from Geneva
Fashion influencers
1984 births
Women jewellers